This is a list of notable environmental reports. In this context they relate to the impacts of human activity on the environment.

Clean Energy Trends – a series of reports by Clean Edge – beginning in 2002
Copeland Report – for the U.S. government, completed in 1933
Copenhagen Diagnosis – written by twenty-six climate scientists from eight countries
Dioxin Reassessment Report – by the United States Environmental Protection Agency
Environmental Impact of the Big Cypress Swamp Jetport ("Leopold Report") – United States Department of the Interior (1969)
Environmental Risks and Challenges of Anthropogenic Metals Flows and Cycles – by the International Resource Panel
Forest Principles – United Nations Conference on Environment and Development (UNCED)
The Global Assessment Report on Biodiversity and Ecosystem Services — Intergovernmental Science-Policy Platform on Biodiversity and Ecosystem Services (2019)
The Global 2000 Report to the President – Council on Environmental Quality (1981)
Global Environment Outlook – United Nations Environment Programme (UNEP)
Hirsch report (Peaking of World Oil Production: Impacts, Mitigation, and Risk Management) – United States Department of Energy
Index of Leading Environmental Indicators – Pacific Research Institute
IPCC First Assessment Report – Intergovernmental Panel on Climate Change (IPCC)
IPCC supplementary report, 1992 – IPCC
IPCC Second Assessment Report – IPCC
IPCC Third Assessment Report Climate Change 2001 – IPCC (2001)
IPCC Fourth Assessment Report Climate Change 2007 – IPCC (2007)
IPCC Fifth Assessment Report (2014)
Leopold Report ("Wildlife Management in the National Parks") – Special Advisory Board on Wildlife Management (1963)
Livestock's Long Shadow – Environmental Issues and Options – United Nations (2006)
Living Planet Report – WWF, every two years
Making Sweden an Oil-Free Society – Government of Sweden (2006)
Meat Atlas – published by the Heinrich Böll Foundation and Friends of the Earth Europe
Nuclear Power and the Environment – UK Royal Commission on Environmental Pollution – 1976
Our Common Future – World Commission on Environment and Development (1987)
Outlook On Renewable Energy In America (2 volumes) – American Council on Renewable Energy – 2007
Phase I Environmental Site Assessment – generic
Pollution and Health (Lancet Commission Report on Pollution and Health 2017
Planning Policy Statement 10: Planning for Sustainable Waste Management (PPS 10) – British Government
Renewable Energy Sources and Climate Change Mitigation – United Nations Intergovernmental Panel on Climate Change (IPCC) – planned for 2010
Report of the Royal Commission on Genetic Modification – Royal Commission on Genetic Modification (2001)
State of the Climate – NOAA/NCDC (published annually)
The State of the World – Worldwatch Institute (published yearly since 1984)
US Environmental Protection Agency – Report on the Environment – US EPA (2016)
Wegman Report – to validate criticisms of reconstructions of the temperature record of the past 1000 years
Windscale: Britain’s Biggest Nuclear Disaster (2007)
World Climate Report – Greening Earth Society
The World's 25 Most Endangered Primates – selected and published by the IUCN Species Survival Commission Primate Specialist Group (IUCN/SSC PSG), the International Primatological Society (IPS), and Conservation International (CI)

See also
Why the future doesn't need us – Bill Joy – April 2000 issue of Wired magazine
2008 Climatic Research Unit study
Garnaut Climate Change Review
Global Environment Outlook
Green annual report
List of environmental books
List of environmental law reviews and journals
List of environmental periodicals
List of environmental websites
Lists of environmental publications
State of the Environment

Reports